Trevor White may refer to:

 Trevor White (actor) (born 1970), Canadian actor
 Trevor White (writer), Irish journalist
 Trevor White (musician) (born 1943), British born musician, part of Sounds Incorporated and solo artist
 Trevor White (skier) (born 1984), Canadian alpine skier
 Trevor White (producer) (born 1985), American film producer